Fan's Field was a ballpark in Centralia, Illinois that served as the home field for the Centralia Cubs (1947-1949), Centralia Sterlings (1950) and Centralia Zeros (1951-1952). Fan's Field had a capacity of 2,500 and was located at the corner of East Rexford Street and Jackson Avenue. The park was adjacent to the Franklin Elementary School.

References

Baseball venues in Illinois
Defunct minor league baseball venues
Mississippi-Ohio Valley League
Illinois State League
Defunct Midwest League ballparks